The fourth Hawke ministry (Labor) was the 57th ministry of the Government of Australia. It was led by the country's 23rd Prime Minister, Bob Hawke. The fourth Hawke ministry succeeded the third Hawke ministry, which dissolved on 4 April 1990 following the federal election that took place on 24 March. The ministry was replaced by the first Keating ministry on 20 December 1991 following the resignation of Hawke as Prime Minister after a successful leadership challenge by Paul Keating.

Cabinet

Outer ministry

Parliamentary Secretaries

See also
 First Hawke ministry
 Second Hawke ministry
 Third Hawke ministry

Notes

Ministries of Elizabeth II
1990 establishments in Australia
1991 disestablishments in Australia
Hawke, 4
Australian Labor Party ministries
Ministry, Hawke 4
Cabinets established in 1990
Cabinets disestablished in 1991